Adi Mehameday (adi me'ha'me'day) is a small town in Asgede Tsimbla woreda in the Semien Mi'irabawi (Northwestern) Zone of Tigray Regional State of Ethiopia. Adi Mehameday is located about  North West of Mekelle.

Adi Mehameday is bordered along the south and southwest by the Tekezé River which separates the town from Tselemti and to the west by Tabia Dedebit. To the north is Tabiya Selam, and to the east by May Tel River. Major village towns are Adi Hilina, Sifra Mariyam, May Tselwadu.

Demographics 
Based on 2012 unpublished census report, this town has a total population of 6302. Most of the settlements are three to five individuals per household.

Climate 
Adi Mehameday is characterized as semiarid to arid climatic regions. November and December are the coldest months.

Economy 
Gum-resin produced and exported from Adi Mehameday.

References

Subdivisions of Ethiopia
Tigray Region